The Rivière des Remparts is a river on the Indian Ocean island of Réunion. It flows south from the slopes of the Piton des Songes, in a deep caldera along the Piton de la Fournaise, reaching the sea at the town of Saint-Joseph. It forms part of the Rivière des Remparts – Rivière Langevin Important Bird Area.

References

Rivers of Réunion
Rivers of France